Efrain Guigui (September 19, 1925 – June 18, 2007) was a US-based Panamanian born clarinetist and conductor.

Early life
Guigui was born on September 19, 1925 in Panama. He grew up in Argentina, where he attended the Student Music Conservatory in Buenos Aires. He graduated from Boston University.

Career
At the age of 15, Guigui was the youngest clarinetist to ever play first chair in the Buenos Aires Symphony Orchestra, at the iconic Colon Theater, where he played under the tutelage of such great conductors as Herbert Von Karajan, Otto Klemperer and Arturo Toscanini. It was there that he began developing his conducting skills and becoming highly regarded for his unique ability to interpret contemporary music true to its intent. Guigui's perfect pitch and mesmerizing solfege quickly established him as the premier conductor for contemporary music.

In the 1950s Guigui met and worked with Composer Aaron Copland, who later invited Guigui to the United States to conduct in Tanglewood, where Guigui remained studying at Boston University graduating with high honors. Guigui and his wife Elena moved to New York City in 1960 where Guigui played clarinet in the New York Philharmonic under the direction of Leonard Bernstein. Guigui made his American debut as conductor Maestro Guigui at Town Hall and went on to tour with the American Ballet Theatre.

Guigui was then invited by Pablo Casals to San Juan, Puerto Rico to play clarinet with the Casals Festival and conduct the Puerto Rico Symphony Orchestra. Guigui and his family (his son Martin, daughter Ana) all moved to and lived in Puerto Rico, where Guigui was also a full-time professor at the Conservatory of Music.  Guigui went on to work alongside the likes of Itzhak Perlman, Isaac Stern, Yehudi Menuhin, Daniel Barenboim, Luciano Pavarotti, Placido Domingo, and Alexander Schneider.

Maestro Guigui was the conductor of the Vermont Symphony Orchestra from 1974 to 1989. He also conducted orchestras as a guest in South America. Additionally, he was a guest conductor at the Juilliard School in New York City.

Guigui taught clarinet and conducting at Dartmouth College where he also conducted the Dartmouth Symphony.

Guigui founded the Panama Youth Orchestra.

Guigui established a children's orchestra in Mexico. He was the recipient of the Governor's Award for Excellence in the Arts from the Vermont Council on the Arts in 1989.

In 1986 Guigui won the Ditson Conductor's Award.

Guigui and his childhood best friend, Pulitzer Prize winning composer Mario Davidovsky, ran the Composers Conference for 40 years, with Guigui making over 3,000 recordings.

Just prior to his passing, Maestro Guigui conducted three nights of the Rachmaninoff Competition at Walt Disney Concert Hall in Los Angeles, to sold out standing ovations.

Death
Guigui died on June 18, 2007 of complications from sarcoma cancer, in Los Angeles, California.

References

External links

1925 births
2007 deaths
Deaths from cancer in California
Boston University alumni
Panamanian emigrants to Argentina
Argentine expatriates in the United States